Richard Edward Gordon Bayford (10 May 1885 – 14 August 1939) was an Australian rules footballer who played with Essendon in the Victorian Football League (VFL).

Notes

External links 
		

1885 births
1939 deaths
Australian rules footballers from Victoria (Australia)
Essendon Football Club players
South Yarra Football Club players